Marcos César Simarelli Winter is a Brazilian actor.

Filmography 
 2019 Segunda Chamada
 2017 Apocalipse - Oswaldo RecordTV
 2015 Magnifica 70 - Vicente HBO Brasil
 2013 Flor do Caribe - Reynaldo Rede Globo
 2010 Malhação - Odilon Rede Globo
 2010 As Cariocas - Élber Rede Globo
 2009 Vende-se um Véu de Noiva (For sale is a Veil of Bride) - Doctor Homero Reis SBT
 2007/2008 Duas Caras - Narciso Tellerman Rede Globo
 2007 Amazônia, de Galvez a Chico Mendes - Neto Rede Globo
 2007 Pé na Jaca - Luchino Rede Globo
 2006 Avassaladoras - A série - Alê Rede Record
 2005 Essas Mulheres - Eduardo Abreu Rede Record
 2004 Um Só Coração - Luís Martins Rede Globo
 2003 Agora É que São Elas - Heitor Rede Globo
 2001 Estrela-Guia - Bob Rede Globo
 1999 Vila Madalena - Roberto Rede Globo
 1998 Pecado Capital - Virgílio Lisboa Rede Globo
 1998 Corpo Dourado - Arthurzinho Rede Globo
 1997 A Indomada - Hércules Pedreira Rede Globo
 1996 O fim do mundo - Nado Mendonça Rede Globo
 1995 Irmãos Coragem - Eduardo Coragem (Duda) Rede Globo
 1994 Fera Ferida - Cassi Jones de Azevedo Rede Globo
 1993 Agosto - Cláudio Aguiar Rede Globo
 1991 Felicidade - José Diogo Rede Globo
 1991 Floradas na serra - Flávio Manchete
 1990 Pantanal - Jove (Joventino neto) Manchete
 1990 Desejo - Dinorá Rede Globo
 1989 Tieta - Osmar Rede Globo
 1988 Vida Nova - Antoninho Rede Globo

References

External links 
 

1966 births
Living people
Brazilian people of German descent
Brazilian people of Italian descent
Brazilian male telenovela actors
Brazilian male television actors
Male actors from São Paulo